The City of Muskogee Foundation is a community foundation created by the City of Muskogee, Oklahoma (which is also the Foundation's sole owner) to manage over $100 million in assets it received from the lease of its City-owned hospital. Each year, the Foundation grants over $2 million to community organizations and non-profit groups throughout the Muskogee community.

Appointed by Muskogee Mayor John Tyler Hammons, the current chair of the board of directors is John Barton, having served in that capacity since the Foundation was established in 2008.

Mission statement
The mission statement of the Foundation is "Making a Real Difference" for Muskogee.

History
2007 - The Foundation's history begins in March 2007 when the City of Muskogee entered into a 40-year lease agreement with Capella Healthcare to operate the city's hospital, Muskogee Regional Medical Center. The Foundation was founded from the net proceeds of the agreement.

2008 - The Foundation was incorporated under the laws of the State of Oklahoma on June 24, 2008. The purpose of the Foundation is to issue grants to qualified non-profit organizations to improve the quality of life for Muskogee residents.

2009 - In its inaugural granting year, the Foundation reinvested almost $1 million in grant money back into the Muskogee community.

Leadership
The current executive director is Frank Merrick, who has served in the position since the Foundation was established in 2008.

See also
Community foundation

External links
City of Muskogee Foundation official website

Community foundations based in the United States
Muskogee, Oklahoma
2008 establishments in Oklahoma
Charities based in Oklahoma